Werner Fourie (born 28 July 1998) is a South African rugby union player for the  in the Currie Cup. His regular position is hooker.

Fourie was named in the  squad for the 2021 Currie Cup Premier Division.

References

South African rugby union players
1998 births
Living people
Rugby union hookers
Blue Bulls players